The Marshallese records in athletics are maintained by the Marshall Islands' national athletics federation: the Marshall Islands Athletics Federation (MIAF).

Outdoor

Key to tables:
  

ht = hand timing

# = not ratified by federation

OT = oversized track (> 200m in circumference)

Men

Women

Indoor

Men

Women

References

External links

Marshallese
Records
Athletics
Athletics